The 2023 Michigan Wolverines football team is an American football team that will represent the University of Michigan in the East Division of the Big Ten Conference during the 2023 NCAA Division I FBS football season. The team will be coached by Jim Harbaugh in his ninth season leading the Wolverines.

Preseason

2022 season
The 2022 Michigan Wolverines football team compiled an 12–0 record in the regular season. This resulted in Michigan's second consecutive appearance in the Big Ten Football Championship Game, where they beat the Purdue Boilermakers by a score of 43–22. Michigan secured its second consecutive Big Ten championship for the first time since 2003–04, and its first consecutive outright pair of championships since 1991–92. The team also earned its second consecutive appearance in the College Football Playoff, where they were defeated by the TCU Horned Frogs in the Fiesta Bowl.

Firing of Matt Weiss
On January 17, 2023, sources reported that co-offensive coordinator and quarterbacks coach Matt Weiss was placed on leave pending an ongoing police investigation into a report of "computer access crimes" that occurred in December 2022. On January 20, 2023, Michigan announced that “[a]fter a review of University policies, the athletic department has terminated the appointment of co-offensive coordinator/quarterbacks coach Matt Weiss."

Coaching changes

 On January 27, it was announced that Michigan promoted Kirk Campbell to the role of quarterbacks coach, replacing the departed Matt Weiss. Campbell spent 2022 at Michigan as an offensive analyst after serving as the offensive coordinator at Old Dominion for 2 seasons. 

 On February 8, Michigan announced the return of former Michigan assistant Chris Partridge to the staff in an unspecified role. Partridge served in a variety of roles at Michigan from 2015 to 2019 and spent the last three seasons as the co-defensive coordinator and safeties coach at Ole Miss. 

 On February 16, Michigan and linebackers coach George Helow mutually agreed to part ways. 

 The next day on February 17, Michigan announced that the previously hired Chris Partridge would be the linebackers coach, replacing Helow. In the same announcement, Sherrone Moore became the sole offensive coordinator, previously serving as the co-offensive coordinator alongside Matt Weiss.

Recruiting

2023 recruiting class

Incoming transfers

Schedule

Game Summaries

East Carolina

Sources:

UNLV

Sources:

Bowling Green

Sources:

Rutgers

Sources:

at Nebraska
 

Sources:

at Minnesota

Sources:

Indiana

Sources:

at Michigan State

Sources:

Purdue

Sources:

at Penn State

Sources:

at Maryland

Sources:

Ohio State

Sources:

Roster

References

Michigan
Michigan Wolverines football seasons
Michigan Wolverines football